Kettlestone is a village and civil parish in the English county of Norfolk.
For the purposes of local government, it falls within the district of North Norfolk.

The village has several farms and a small church. Also included in the parish is Pensthorpe home of the Pensthorpe Nature Reserve. The village is broadly aligned east to west about a single street with houses mainly to the north.

History
The villages name means 'Ketil's farm/settlement'.

The village dates back to the time of the Domesday Book. The village church is built of the local flint stone and is thought to date from the 13th century. The tower which dates from the 14th century is unusual for Norfolk in that it is octagonal (Norfolk churches tend to have square towers, or occasionally round towers). The church was extensively restored in the Victorian period, work being completed in 1871. Inside the church is a 500-year-old font with shields showing the lion and the fleur-de-lys of England and France, the keys of Peter and the swords of Paul, the arms of the see of Norwich (the church is within the Anglican Diocese of Norwich), and the emblem of the Trinity.

A memorial in the church to William Newman tells us that in thanks for the kindness shown to him when he was brought up here as a poor London boy in the 18th century he left £500 to the poor of Kettlestone forever.

The lychgate is a 20th-century memorial to James Cory, rector of Kettlestone for 68 years until his death in 1864, who is buried in the churchyard. He began as rector in 1796, and hence was preaching during the French Revolution, Trafalgar and Waterloo, the Crimean War and the Indian Mutiny.

Notes

External links

Kettlestone Parish Council website https://web.archive.org/web/20110725051753/http://www.norfolkrcc.org.uk/wiki/index.php/Kettlestone_Parish_Council

References
  Much of this material is mentioned in THE KING'S ENGLAND – NORFOLK – Green Pastures and Still Waters, edited by Arthur Mee, Hodder & Stoughton, London, 1940.
http://kepn.nottingham.ac.uk/map/place/Norfolk/Kettlestone

Villages in Norfolk
Civil parishes in Norfolk
North Norfolk